Bajram Curri, formerly known as Kolgecaj, is a town and administrative unit in the municipality of Tropojë, northeastern Albania, within the historical ethnographic region of the Gjakova Highlands. The town is located in a remote and mountainous region of the Albanian Alps, within the Valbonë Valley, and close to the border with Kosovo. It is named after Bajram Curri, a national hero who fought for ethnic Albanians, first against the Ottoman Empire and later against the Albanian government.

History 

Bajram Curri was founded in the year 1957 to serve as the centre of the district of Tropoja. The village was previously known as Kolgecaj. The newly formed city was built based on socialist principles.

Geography 

Bajram Curri is located down the valley of the river Valbonë. It is the main access point by road to the villages of Valbona and Rrogam. Water from the mountains flow into the waters of the Valbonë, the latter being famous for having the clearest river water in Albania. It is an administrative unit and the seat of the municipality of Tropojë.

Climate 

Bajram Curri has a humid subtropical climate (Köppen climate classification: Cfa).

Seeing silent lightning is very common in the summer nights of Bajram Curri.

Economy 

The municipality of Tropojë has many agricultural products and is famous for its chestnuts, apples, nuts, grapes, and especially blueberries.
Large reserves of platinum, rhodium, ruthenium, palladium, iridium, and osmium have been discovered in Tropojë. 
Albanian, Italian, and Chinese engineers, working for Albanian Minerals and Bytyci Sh.p.k in Tropojë, suggest the area may have more than 500 million tons of chrome ore and more than two billion tons of olivine in which 5-7 grams of platinum is present per ton. This gigantic body of ore is one of the largest in the world.

Demography 

As of the 2011 census, the administrative unit of Bajram Curri had an estimated population of 5,340 of whom 2,717 were men and 2,623 women.

Notable people 

 Sheh Ali Nimani – invented first school in Tropoja in village called Tpla
 Sali Berisha – President of Albania from 1992 to 1997 and its Prime Minister from 2005 to 2013
 Zhaneta Byberi – Miss Universe Albania 2014
 Azem Hajdari – anti-Communist activist
 Besnik Mustafaj – 62nd Minister of Foreign Affairs of Albania
 Gerhard Progni – footballer
 Fatime Sokoli – folk singer
 Fatmira Breçani – folk singer 
 Ibrahim Kadri Malaj – intellectual
 Tahir Sinani – commander of Kosovo Liberation Army (KLA)
 Bajram Mal Gjongecaj – intellectual, sports trainer, basketball coach

Notes

References

External links 

Towns in Albania
Administrative units of Tropojë
Former municipalities in Kukës County